Keaton Ellerby (born November 5, 1988) is a retired Canadian professional ice hockey player. He last played under contract with the Sheffield Steelers of the Elite Ice Hockey League (EIHL). He previously played in the National Hockey League for the Florida Panthers, Los Angeles Kings and Winnipeg Jets.

Playing career

Junior
Ellerby was drafted 10th overall by the Florida Panthers in the 2007 NHL Entry Draft from the Kamloops Blazers of the Western Hockey League. During the 2008 World Junior Hockey Championship, Ellerby was invited to try out for the tournament, having played for Canada at the 2007 Superseries against the Russians.

Professional

Ellerby scored his first NHL goal on January 25, 2011 against Henrik Lundqvist of the New York Rangers. During the 2012–13 season, on February 8, 2013, Ellerby was traded by the Panthers to the Los Angeles Kings for a fifth-round selection in the 2013 NHL Draft. The Kings re-signed Ellerby to a one-year deal in July 2013,  but he was claimed off waivers by the Winnipeg Jets a month into the 2013–14 season.

Ellerby signed a one-year contract with the Jets the following summer for the 2014–15 season. He spent most of the season in the minors.

On July 7, 2015, Ellerby signed his first contract abroad, agreeing to a one-year deal with Barys Astana of the Kontinental Hockey League. After 42 games with the Kazakh-based club, Ellerby sought a release and immediately signed with Swiss team HC Fribourg-Gottéron of the National League A on January 4, 2016, for the remainder of the 2015–16 season. Ellerby also played for Team Canada during Spengler Cup and won the championship scoring one of the goals in the final game.

The following season, Ellerby signed for the 2016–17 season with Finnish Liiga outfit, Lukko Rauma. Ellerby proved to be a solid addition to Lukko's blueline, contributing steady defensive play to go along with 3 goals and 12 points in 43 games.

On July 10, 2017, Ellerby agreed to a one-year deal with top tier Swedish club, Mora IK of the Swedish Hockey League (SHL). He contributed with a heavily defensive role, logging the most blocked shots in the SHL and playing big minutes. After one season with a struggling club, he agreed to a one-year deal with German club, Iserlohn Roosters of the DEL, on September 13, 2018.

As a free agent midway into the 2019–20 season, Ellerby continued his professional career signing in the neighbouring Austrian Hockey League with the Dornbirn Bulldogs on November 18, 2019.

In the 2020-21 season, Ellerby moved to Hungary to sign for Erste Liga side Ferencvárosi TC. 

In August 2021, Ellerby agreed terms with UK EIHL side Sheffield Steelers for the 2021-22 season - following in the footsteps of Justin Hodgman who also moved to Sheffield from Ferencvarosi earlier in the summer. Ellerby retired from hockey in the summer of 2022.

International play
In December 2015, he won the Spengler Cup with Team Canada.

Coaching career
Upon retirement from playing in 2022, Ellerby was named an assistant coach of Western Hockey League (WHL) side Prince Albert Raiders.

Personal
Ellerby is first cousins with Shane Doan, former captain of the Phoenix Coyotes, and second cousin to Carey Price, goaltender of the Montreal Canadiens.  Ellerby's uncle, Alvin Liknes, was a Calgary businessman whose disappearance and murder garnered national attention in 2014.

Career statistics

Regular season and playoffs

International

References

External links

1988 births
Barys Nur-Sultan players
Canadian expatriate ice hockey players in Finland
Canadian expatriate ice hockey players in Switzerland
Canadian ice hockey defencemen
Dornbirn Bulldogs players
Ferencvárosi TC (ice hockey) players
Florida Panthers draft picks
Florida Panthers players
HC Fribourg-Gottéron players
Ice hockey people from Alberta
Iserlohn Roosters players
Kamloops Blazers players
Living people
Los Angeles Kings players
Lukko players
Moose Jaw Warriors players
Mora IK players
National Hockey League first-round draft picks
Rochester Americans players
Sheffield Steelers players
St. John's IceCaps players
Winnipeg Jets players